Pippy Park Golf Club, is a public golf course located in St. John's, Newfoundland, Canada. The facility contains two courses: Admiral's Green is an 18-hole championship course and Captain's Hill is a 9-hole course.

See also
List of golf courses in Newfoundland and Labrador

External links
Official website

Golf clubs and courses in Newfoundland and Labrador
1993 establishments in Newfoundland and Labrador